A desk is a piece of furniture intended for writing on, hence writing desk is redundant. It is usually found in an office or study.

Operation
Traditionally, a desk was meant for writing by hand letters but it has adapted to accommodate first typewriters and now computers. Some variations, like the bureau have a top that closes to hide current work, which makes the room containing it look tidy, maintains privacy, and protects the work.  The closing top may take the form of a drum that is rolled closed, while others fold closed.  The writing surface (or place for lap-top) typically folds down (when also being the lid) or slides out, to preserve the compact size when closed.  They usually have bigger drawers below the writing surface and small drawers or "pigeon holes" inside the closing part.

Modern writing desks are designed for laptop computers of the 21st century. They are typically too small for most desktop computers or a printer.

See also 
 Desk
 Drawing board
 Stipo a bambocci

Desks